Roland Jacoby (born 16 April 1952) is a Luxembourgian sport shooter. He was born in Luxembourg.

He competed at the 1980 Summer Olympics in Moscow, at the 1984 Summer Olympics in Los Angeles, and at the 1988 Summer Olympics in Seoul.

References

1952 births
Living people
Sportspeople from Luxembourg City
Luxembourgian male sport shooters
Olympic shooters of Luxembourg
Shooters at the 1980 Summer Olympics
Shooters at the 1984 Summer Olympics
Shooters at the 1988 Summer Olympics